Kevin Jörg (born 11 September 1995) is a Swiss racing driver and a former member of the Renault Sport Academy.

Career

Karting
Jörg first began karting in 2007, partaking in numerous championships across Switzerland.

Lower Formulae
In 2011, Jörg graduated to single-seaters, competing in four races of Formula Abarth with Jenzer Motorsport, where he finished nineteenth in the European Championship and twenty second in the Italian. That same year, Jörg competed in the Formula BMW Talent Cup where he finished fourth. He remained with Jenzer in Formula Abarth full-time the following year, finishing sixth in both championships.

Formula Renault
In 2012, Jörg partook in one round of both the Eurocup Formula Renault 2.0 championship and Northern European Cup with EPIC Racing and Daltec respectively. The following year, Jörg moved to Eurocup full-time with Jenzer, where he finished fourteenth overall. He also competed in the Alps Series, where he claimed three podiums and finished fourth.

In 2014, Jörg switched to Josef Kaufmann Racing, where he claimed his maiden Eurocup victory and finished sixth. He claimed two additional victories in NEC, as well as three pole positions and fastest laps, and finished fourteenth overall. He remained with Josef Kaufmann the following year where he finished third in Eurocup and as NEC vice-champion.

GP3 Series
In 2016, it was announced that Jörg would race with the DAMS squad in their maiden season. He finished fourteenth overall.

In January 2017, Jörg switched to Trident.

Formula One
In February 2016, Jörg was among four drivers incorporated into the newly formed Renault Sport Academy. The following year, Jörg was dropped from the program.

Racing record

Career summary

Complete GP3 Series results
(key) (Races in bold indicate pole position) (Races in italics indicate fastest lap)

† Driver did not finish the race, but was classified as he completed over 90% of the race distance.

References

External links
 
 

1995 births
Living people
Swiss racing drivers
Formula Abarth drivers
Formula Renault 2.0 NEC drivers
Formula Renault Eurocup drivers
Formula BMW drivers
Swiss GP3 Series drivers
Jenzer Motorsport drivers
Jo Zeller Racing drivers
Josef Kaufmann Racing drivers
DAMS drivers
Trident Racing drivers
EPIC Racing drivers
Formula Lista Junior drivers